Pennsylvania Route 97 can refer to either of two state highways in Pennsylvania that share the same number, but were never connected:
Pennsylvania Route 97 (Adams County)
Pennsylvania Route 97 (Erie County)

97